Mariarano is a town and commune in Madagascar. It belongs to the district of Mahajanga II, which is a part of Boeny Region. The population of the commune was estimated to be approximately 6,000 in the 2001 commune census.

Only primary schooling is available. The majority 50% of the population of the commune are farmers, while an additional 10% receive their livelihood from raising livestock. The most important crops are rice and sugarcane, while other important agricultural products are bananas and cassava.  Services provide employment for 5% of the population. Additionally fishing employs 35% of the population.

References and notes 

Populated places in Boeny